The 2011 Speedway World Cup Qualification (SWC) was a two events of motorcycle speedway meetings, host in Italy and Germany, used to determine the two national teams who qualify for the 2011 Speedway World Cup. According to the FIM rules the top six nations (Poland, Denmark, Sweden, Great Britain, Australia and Russia) from the 2010 Speedway World Cup were automatically qualified. Qualification was won by Czech Republic and Germany teams.

Results

Heat details

Qualifying Round One 
17 April 2010
 Lonigo, Veneto
Pista Santa Marina (Length: 334 m)
Referee:  Craig Ackroyd
Jury President:  Jorgen L. Jensen
References

Qualifying Round Two 
7 May 2010
  Landshut, Bavaria
Speedway Stadion Ellermühle (Length: 392 m)
Referee:  Michael Bates
Jury President:  Ilkka Teromaa
References

See also 
 2011 Speedway World Cup

References 

Q